Oh, My God! is the debut album by the rapper Doug E. Fresh. It was released in 1986 on Reality Records, a short-lived subsidiary of Fantasy Records. The album was produced by Dennis Bell and Ollie Cotton. The album was only a moderate success, peaking at #21 on the Top R&B Albums chart. To date, it has not been released on compact disc.

Critical reception
Trouser Press wrote that "Fresh runs a moderate course, with a bit of reggae toasting, polite tracks and very little attitude." The Washington Post thought that "the sound concocted by DJs Chill Will and Barry Bee is a somewhat murky sonic collage built on rolling reggae rhythms."

Track listing
"Nuthin'" - 3:02
"The Show (Oh, My God! Remix)" - 8:38 
"Leave It Up to the Cut Professor" - 2:25
"Lovin' Ev'ry Minute of It" (Cyclone Ride)" - 4:24
"She Was the Type of Girl" - 5:26<
"Abortion" - 4:21
"Chill Will Cuttin' It Up" - 0:40
"Play This Only at Night" - 5:15
"All the Way to Heaven" - 6:05

Charts

References 

Fantasy Records albums
Chrysalis Records albums
1986 debut albums
Doug E. Fresh albums